Colasposoma subcostatum is a species of leaf beetle of East Africa and the Democratic Republic of the Congo. It was first described by Carl Eduard Adolph Gerstaecker in 1871.

References

subcostatum
Beetles of the Democratic Republic of the Congo
Taxa named by Carl Eduard Adolph Gerstaecker
Beetles described in 1871
Insects of East Africa